In mathematics, the Ulam numbers comprise an integer sequence devised by and named after Stanislaw Ulam, who introduced it in 1964.  The standard Ulam sequence (the (1, 2)-Ulam  sequence) starts with U1 = 1 and U2 = 2.  Then for n > 2, Un is defined to be the smallest integer that is the sum of two distinct earlier terms in exactly one way and larger than all earlier terms.

Examples
As a consequence of the definition, 3 is an Ulam number (1 + 2); and 4 is an Ulam number (1 + 3). (Here 2 + 2 is not a second representation of 4, because the previous terms must be distinct.)  The integer 5 is not an Ulam number, because 5 = 1 + 4 = 2 + 3.  The first few terms are
1, 2, 3, 4, 6, 8, 11, 13, 16, 18, 26, 28, 36, 38, 47, 48, 53, 57, 62, 69, 72, 77, 82, 87, 97, 99, 102, 106, 114, 126, 131, 138, 145, 148, 155, 175, 177, 180, 182, 189, 197, 206, 209, 219, 221, 236, 238, 241, 243, 253, 258, 260, 273, 282, ... .

There are infinitely many Ulam numbers. For, after the first n numbers in the sequence have already been determined, it is always possible to extend the sequence by one more element:  is uniquely represented as a sum of two of the first n numbers, and there may be other smaller numbers that are also uniquely represented in this way, so the next element can be chosen as the smallest of these uniquely representable numbers.

Ulam is said to have conjectured that the numbers have zero density, but they seem to have a density of approximately 0.07398.

Properties
Apart from 1 + 2 = 3 any subsequent Ulam number cannot be the sum of its two prior consecutive Ulam numbers.
Proof: Assume that for n > 2, Un−1 + Un = Un+1 is the required sum in only one way; then so does Un−2 + Un produce a sum in only one way, and it falls between Un and Un+1. This contradicts the condition that Un+1 is the next smallest Ulam number.

For n > 2, any three consecutive Ulam numbers (Un−1, Un, Un+1)  as integer sides will form a triangle.

Proof: The previous property states that for n > 2, Un−2 + Un ≥ Un + 1. Consequently Un−1 + Un > Un+1 and because Un−1 < Un < Un+1 the triangle inequality is satisfied.

The sequence of Ulam numbers forms a complete sequence.
Proof: By definition Un = Uj + Uk where j < k < n and is the smallest integer that is the sum of two distinct smaller Ulam numbers in exactly one way. This means that for all Un with n > 3, the greatest value that Uj can have is Un−3 and the greatest value that Uk can have is Un−1.
Hence Un ≤ Un−1 + Un−3 < 2Un−1  and U1 = 1, U2 = 2, U3 = 3. This is a sufficient condition for Ulam numbers to be a complete sequence.

For every integer n > 1 there is always at least one Ulam number Uj such that n ≤ Uj < 2n.
Proof: It has been proved that there are infinitely many Ulam numbers and they start at 1. Therefore for every integer n > 1 it is possible to find j such that Uj−1 ≤ n ≤ Uj. From the proof above for n > 3, Uj ≤ Uj−1 + Uj−3 < 2Uj−1. Therefore n ≤ Uj < 2Uj−1 ≤ 2n. Also for n = 2 and 3 the property is true by calculation.

In any sequence of 5 consecutive positive integers {i, i + 1,..., i + 4}, i > 4 there can be a maximum of 2 Ulam numbers.
Proof: Assume that the sequence {i, i + 1,..., i + 4} has its first value i = Uj an Ulam number then it is possible that i + 1 is the next Ulam number Uj+1. Now consider i + 2, this cannot be the next Ulam number Uj+2 because it is not a unique sum of two previous terms. i + 2 = Uj+1 + U1 = Uj + U2. A similar argument exists for i + 3 and i + 4.

Inequalities
Ulam numbers are pseudo-random and too irregular to have tight bounds. Nevertheless from the properties above, namely, at worst the next Ulam number Un+1 ≤ Un + Un−2 and in any five consecutive positive integers at most two can be Ulam numbers, it can be stated that
 ≤ Un ≤ Nn+1 for n > 0,
where Nn are the numbers in Narayana’s cows sequence: 1,1,1,2,3,4,6,9,13,19,... with the  recurrence  relation Nn = Nn−1 +Nn−3 that starts at N0.

Hidden structure
It has been observed that the first 10 million Ulam numbers satisfy  except for the four elements  (this has now been verified for the first  Ulam numbers). Inequalities of this type are usually true for sequences exhibiting some form of periodicity but the Ulam sequence does not seem to be periodic and the phenomenon is not understood. It can be exploited to do a fast computation of the Ulam sequence (see External links).

Generalizations
The idea can be generalized as (u, v)-Ulam numbers by selecting different starting values (u, v). A sequence of (u, v)-Ulam numbers is regular if the sequence of differences between consecutive numbers in the sequence is eventually periodic. When v is an odd number greater than three, the (2, v)-Ulam numbers are regular. When v is congruent to 1 (mod 4) and at least five, the (4, v)-Ulam numbers are again regular. However, the Ulam numbers themselves do not appear to be regular.

A sequence of numbers is said to be s-additive if each number in the sequence, after the initial 2s terms of the sequence, has exactly s representations as a sum of two previous numbers. Thus, the Ulam numbers and the (u, v)-Ulam numbers are 1-additive sequences.

If a sequence is formed by appending the largest number with a unique representation as a sum of two earlier numbers, instead of appending the smallest uniquely representable number, then the resulting sequence is the sequence of Fibonacci numbers.

Notes

References

External links
 Ulam Sequence from MathWorld
 Fast computation of the Ulam sequence by Philip Gibbs
 Description of Algorithm by Donald Knuth
 The github page of Daniel Ross

Integer sequences